Bar-Abba or bar Abba ((Aramaic: בר-אבא, Bar-abbâ, "son of the father")) may refer to:

Yeshua bar Abba, or Barabbas
Abba bar Abba 
Tanhuma bar Abba
 Ḥiyya bar Abba
Samuel bar Abba